Anna "Aurore" Leonida Grandien (4 October 1857 – 2 February 1940) was a Swedish educator, journalist, newspaper editor, and publisher. She served as the chief editor and publisher of the newspaper . In 1927, she was awarded the Swedish royal medal Illis quorum in recognition of her career as an editor and publisher.

Life 
Aurore Grandien was born on 4 October 1857 in Gävle, Sweden. She was the oldest child of Anna Margareta Norbohm (née Holmgren) and Martin Leonard Norbohm, a weaver at the  cotton mill. As a child, Grandien had the responsibility of taking care of two younger siblings: Karl and Bertha. From 1877 to 1878, she attended the primary school teacher training college in Bollnäs. Between 1878 and 1884, she worked as a teacher in Österfärnebo and in Gävle. At a school meeting, she met  who was a teacher at the Söderhamn grammar school, as well as the editor of the newspaper . They married in 1885, and Aurore was appointed the editor. 

Söderhamns Tidning was  a liberal newspaper and published articles on literary, cultural, and musical topics. After the death of her husband in 1904, Grandien became the editor-in-chief and publisher of the publication. In 1913, she took over the printing and the bookbinding workshops. Originally a two-day newspaper, Grandien worked to expand the business and modernise the company, and Söderhamns Tidning subsequently became a daily publication. She retired from the editor-in-chief post at the age of 70. In 1927, she was honoured with the Swedish royal medal Illis quorum in recognition of her career as an editor and publisher. In 1938, she was granted an honorary member of the Swedish newspaper publishers' association, . 

Grandien died in Ängelholm, on 2 February 1940.

References

Further reading
 

1857 births
1940 deaths
19th-century Swedish journalists
Swedish women editors
Swedish editors
Swedish newspaper editors
People from Gävle
19th-century Swedish businesspeople
Swedish newspaper publishers (people)
19th-century publishers (people)
19th-century newspaper publishers (people)
Recipients of the Illis quorum